Sulejman Maliqati (1 August 1928 – 5 October 2022) was an Albanian footballer who played as a goalkeeper, most notably for Partizani Tirana.

Club career

Maliqati played for hometown club Besa before embarking on a successful career with Partizani, winning seven league titles with the club. The goalkeeper was known for never wearing gloves during a game.

International career

Maliqati made his debut for Albania in a September 1950 friendly match against Hungary and earned a total of five caps. His final international was a June 1963 European Championship qualification match against Denmark.

Personal life

His son, the late Agim Maliqati was also a goalkeeper for Vllaznia and Lokomotiva Durrës. Agim died on 1 May 2012, aged 51.

Honours

Partizani
 Kategoria Superiore (7): 1954, 1957, 1958, 1959, 1961, 1963, 1964.

References

External links

1928 births
2022 deaths
Footballers from Kavajë
Albanian footballers
Association football goalkeepers
Albania international footballers
Kategoria Superiore players
Besa Kavajë players
FK Partizani Tirana players